Frying Dutchman may refer to:
 The Frying Dutchman, a recurring location in the animated TV series The Simpsons
 Frying Dutchman, an anti-nuclear group in Japan

See also
 Flying Dutchman (disambiguation)